Sorana Cîrstea was the defending champion but decided to play at the 2012 Mutua Madrid Open instead.

Yulia Putintseva won the title defeating Patricia Mayr-Achleitner in the final 6–2, 6–1.

Seeds

Draw

Finals

Top half

Bottom half

References
 Main Draw
 Qualifying Draw

Open GDF Suez de Cagnes-sur-Mer Alpes-Maritimes - Singles